Thout 10 - Coptic Calendar - Thout 12

The eleventh day of the Coptic month of Thout, the first month of the Coptic year. On a common year, this day corresponds to September 8, of the Julian Calendar, and September 21, of the Gregorian Calendar. This day falls in the Coptic season of Akhet, the season of inundation.

Commemorations

Feasts 

 Coptic New Year Priod

Saints 
 The martyrdom of Saint Basilides the Minister
 The martyrdom of the three Farmers in Esna

References 

Days of the Coptic calendar